Crescimbeni is an Italian surname. Notable people with the surname include:

Camila Crescimbeni (born 1990), Argentine politician
Emmanuel Crescimbeni (born 1990), American-born Peruvian swimmer
Giovanni Mario Crescimbeni (1663–1728), Italian critic and poet

Italian-language surnames